Bayo Onanuga (born 20 June 1957) is a Nigerian journalist. He co-founded TheNews Magazine and was appointed managing director of the News Agency of Nigeria by President Muhammadu Buhari in May 2016. Preceding that, he was the CEO and editor-in-chief of PM News and TheNEWS magazine.

Background 
Onanuga was born to the family of Anikilaya Ruling House in Ijebu Ode, Ogun State. He started his education at Moslem Primary School, Ijebu-Ode, 1962–1969. He then went to  Muslim College Ijebu Ode and finished in 1974 with a Grade One.

After briefly working for a year,  he went to Federal Government College, Odogbolu for his A-Level, between 1975 and 1977.

He was admitted to the University of Lagos in September 1977 to study  Mass Communication.  He graduated in 1980 with a second class upper.

Onanuga worked for Practions Partners in early 1982 and joined Ogun State Television as a pioneer staff in June 1982.

In July 1983, he moved to The Guardian in Lagos as a sub editor and left just 17 months after to start Weekly Titbits.

When the effort failed, Onanuga joined the National Concord in January 1985 as senior features writer. His service was later transferred to the  African Concord magazine. Onanuga in 1989 was the international editor of the magazine, based in London. Later that year, he was appointed the editor.

But in April 1992, Onanuga resigned from Concord after he declined to apologise to the military dictator, General Ibrahim Babangida, over a cover story: Has Babangida Given Up?  The story triggered the closure of the Concord Group by the junta.

Onanuga, together with Seye Kehinde, owner of City People Magazine, Dapo Olorunyomi publisher of Premium Times, Sani Kabir, who later became Sarki of Hausawa in Ebute Meta, Idowu Obasa, who served as chairman in Onigbongbo local government in Ikeja, Babafemi Ojudu senator in Ekiti and Kunle Ajibade  teamed up to set up TheNews Magazine in February 1993.

After TheNEWS was shut down by the military government, the group floated TEMPO magazine and later P.M.NEWS in 1994. .

Political career 
In 2014, Onanuga declared his interest to contest for senatorial position in Ogun east district in the 2015 general election under the platform of All Progressives Congress, (APC). During the military era of Sani Abacha he was held captive by State Security Service in Lagos for some time but later escaped and left the country and returned in 1998 after the death of Abacha. .

References 

Living people
Nigerian journalists
Yoruba journalists
Nigerian company founders
1957 births
University of Lagos alumni
Nigerian newspaper founders
Nigerian newspaper chain founders
Writers from Ogun State